Jānis Vilsons (born 10 January 1944 in Beja, Alūksne Municipality) is a former Latvian handball player who competed for the Soviet Union in the 1972 Summer Olympics.

In 1972 he was part of the Soviet team which finished fifth in the Olympic tournament. He played three matches.

References

External links
  
 
 

1944 births
Living people
Latvian male handball players
Soviet male handball players
Olympic handball players of the Soviet Union
Handball players at the 1972 Summer Olympics
People from Alūksne Municipality